The Hove Festival was a music festival held on the island Tromøya outside of Arendal in southern Norway. It was held for the first time from 26 to 30 June 2007. Running for eight years and at one time the largest music festival in Norway, Hove Festival was discontinued after its 2014 show due to negative profits. Hove Festival was acquired by Festival Republic in 2008 after going bankrupt. As with other Festival Republic events, there were no age restrictions, and children under the age of 12 were admitted free of charge.
 
Hove strove to be an environmentally neutral festival, both buying carbon offset quotes for all power and transportation used during and prior to the festival, and sorting and recycling all trash produced by the event. Preparation for the festival relied heavily on volunteer work. In 2010 there were a total of 2,500 people volunteering for security, stage hand, drivers, kitchen duty and post-festival cleanup.

Hove consisted of several different areas such as the camp area, festival area and "zero" area. The camp held up to 10,000 campers and was open throughout the festival. The festival area, including the shopping street, was open to everyone who had a day bracelet or festival bracelet. The zero area, which has several fast-food shops,  was open to everyone with or without bracelet.

The festival had three main performance stages: Hovescenen, Amfiscenen and Teltscenen (tent stage), with Hovescenen being the largest. One of the more prominent acts at Hovescenen was Muse in 2010.

2007 

In 2007 there were 72,000 visitors and 53,000 sold tickets, which included 7,700 week passes, making this Norway's largest music festival of the year.

Program 2007 

Tuesday 26 June

Hovescenen:
Queens of the Stone Age / Incubus / CSS / My Midnight Creeps / Hangface
Amfiscenen:
Amy Winehouse / Clipse / Stephen Marley / Darkside of the Force
Amfiscenen, klubb:
Kaiser Chiefs / King Midas
Teltscenen:
Klaxons / The Twang / 65daysofstatic / Junior Boys / Sunkissed

Wednesday 27 June

"In southern Norway the sun only sets for two hours," noted Brandon Flowers of The Killers. "We headlined and we came off just as it was getting dark. We dried off and I sent to see Bright Eyes at 1am, just as it was getting light. That was incredibly moving."
Hovescenen:
The Killers / Arcade Fire / The Hold Steady / Me First and the Gimme Gimmes / X-Queen of the Astronauts
Amfiscenen:
Lamb of God / Chimaira / Unearth / Gojira / Dimension F3H
Amfiscenen, klubb:
Bright Eyes / Susanne Sundfør
Teltscenen:
The View / The Noisettes / The New Violators / Bite / Sunkissed

Thursday 28 June

Hovescenen:
Dipset (with Jim Jones and Juelz Santana) / Chamillionaire / Ludacris  / Papoose / Akala / Venom
Amfiscenen:
Interpol / TV on the Radio / 120 Days / Tokyo Police Club
Amfiscenen, klubb:
Neurosis / Hatebreed / She Said Destroy
Teltscenen:
Oh No Ono / The Presets / The Lionheart Brothers / Brightblack Morning Light / Sunkissed

Friday 29 June

Hovescenen:
Slayer /  Cynic /  Keep of Kalessin
Amfiscenen:
Damien Rice / Nellie McKay / Pleasure / Ingrid Olava / Mastodon
Amfiscenen, klubb:
Omar / Remy Ma
Teltscenen:
The Long Blondes / 1990s / Moving Oos / Violent Years / Sunkissed

Saturday 30 June

Hovescenen:
My Chemical Romance / Billy Talent / Flying Crap / Pale Kids
Amfiscenen:
Sivert Høyem & The Volunteers / Modest Mouse / William Hut / Heroes & Zeroes
Amfiscenen, klubb:
Gossip / The Horrors
Teltscenen:
Devastations / Patrick Wolf / Rockettothesky / Kate Hanevik / Sunkissed

2008  

2327 June 2008, lineup:

 Animal Collective
 Avenged Sevenfold
 Bad Religion
 Band of Horses
 Baroness
 Beck
 Black Kids
 Black Lips
 Black Tide
 The Brian Jonestown Massacre
 Coheed and Cambria
 Converge
 The Cool Kids
 Deerhunter
 Dengue Fever
 Flogging Molly
 Ghostland Observatory
 Hercules and Love Affair
 Howlin' Rain
 Jaguar Love
 Jay-Z
 Job For A Cowboy
 The Raconteurs
 Rival Schools
 Saigon
 Santogold cancelled
 Killswitch Engage
 Panic! at the Disco
 Pase Rock
 Lupe Fiasco
 Les Savy Fav
 MGMT
 Shape of Broad Minds
 St. Vincent
 The Used
 Vampire Weekend
 White Rabbits
 Yeasayer
 The Pigeon Detectives
 Scaramanga Six
 Simian Mobile Disco cancelled
 The Ting Tings*
 Wild Beasts
 The Wombats
 Blood Red Shoes
 Goldfrapp
 Chrome Hoof
 The Count & Sinden
 Bullet for My Valentine
 Babyshambles cancelled
 Duffy
 Foals
 Joe Lean And The Jing Jang Jong
 The Kooks
 M.I.A cancelled
 Neon Neon
 Crystal Castles cancelled
 Black Mountain
 MSTRKRFT
 Stars
 Opeth cancelled
 In Flames
 Hellacopters
 Slagsmålsklubben
 Familjen
 Cavalera Conspiracy
 Mixhell
 Surkin
 The Teenagers
 Boys Noize
 Midnight Juggernauts
 Primordial
 Det Er Jag Som Är Döden
 Dimmu Borgir
 Don Juan Dracula
 Animal Alpha
 Audrey Horne
 Charlotte & The Co-Stars
 Name
 The National Bank
 Necessary Intergalactic Cooperation
 Sigh & Explode
 Silje Nes
 Skatebård
 Taliban Airways
 Thom Hell
 Tommy Tokyo & Starving For My Gravy
 The Generous Days
 Ida Maria (replacement for M.I.A)
 Ingrid Olava
 Lukestar
 Magne F
 Matias Tellez
 Pirate Love
 Purified in Blood
 Satyricon (replacement for Opeth)
 Kim Hiorthøy cancelled
 Truls and the Trees
 Turdus Musicus
 Ungdomskulen
 We
 Zerozonic
 Ladyhawke
 Behemoth
 Bloody Beetroots

 * Ended prematurely due to safety reasons. The venue was overloaded, leaving the floor severely damaged.

2009 
2225 June 2008, lineup:

 Parkway Drive
 Montée
 Fjorden Baby!
 I Was A King
 Casiokids
 The New Wine
 Benea Reach
 Crookers
 M83
 Yuksek
 The Prodigy
 Bring Me the Horizon
 Esser
 Metronomy
 Fujiya & Miyagi
 Franz Ferdinand (headliner)
 White Lies
 The Ting Tings
 Our Fold
 Black Dahlia Murder
 Hockey
 Q-Tip
 Slipknot (headliner)
 Disturbed
 The Killers (headliner)
 The Gaslight Anthem
 All That Remains
 Fleet Foxes
 Eagles of Death Metal
 Faith No More (headliner)

2010  
29 June2 July lineup

 Empire of the Sun
 Pendulum
 Muse (headliner)
 Gallows
 Massive Attack (headliner)
 Ellie Goulding
 Dizzee Rascal
 Florence and the Machine
 Kvelertak
 Kråkesølv
 Serena Maneesh
 Anne Marie Almedal
 Navigators
 Fuck Buttons
 Moddi
 Social Suicide
 Shot At Dawn
 JJ
 Brodinski
 Biffy Clyro
 Heaven Shall Burn
 Arcade Fire (headliner)
 Japandroids
 Alexisonfire
 Them Crooked Vultures (headliner)
 The Antlers
 The Drums
 Paramore
 As I Lay Dying
 Every Time I Die
 Atreyu
 A Day to Remember
 Kendrick Lamar
 Snoop Dogg
 Skrillex
 Knife party
 Vampire Weekend
 Nas & Damian Marley
 Our Fold
 Two Door Cinema Club
 Julian Casablancas

2011  
28 June1 July lineup

 The Strokes - (headliner)
 deadmau5
 Linkin Park - (headliner)
 Thirty Seconds to Mars
 Robyn - (headliner)
 The Vaccines
 Carte Blanche
 Kasabian
 Big Boi
 Honningbarna
 The Mars Volta
 Gold Panda
 Jesse Jones
 Kylesa
 Anna Calvi
 All Time Low
 Turns
 Tinie Tempah
 John Olav Nilsen & Gjengen
 Bright Eyes
 Jimmy Eat World
 Young Dreams
 Razika
 Jenny & Johnny
 Classixx
 Toro Y Moi
 Salvador Sánchez
 Tame Impala
 Brandon Flowers
 Kaizers Orchestra - (headliner)

References

External links
Official website in English
Official website in Norwegian
Feature about Hove and Travel Information from Norway Direct
Official 30 sec 2007 TV-Promo 
NRK P3 Videos from '07
Amnesty - Make Some Noise Campaign
musicOMH reviews Hove Festival 2007
Thrash Hits photo gallery from Hove Festival 2008

Heavy metal festivals in Norway
Rock festivals in Norway
Arendal
2007 establishments in Norway
Culture in Agder
Music festivals established in 2007
Pop music festivals
Music festivals in Norway